Lilly is an unincorporated community in Clinton County, in the U.S. state of Missouri.

History
A post office called Lilly was established in 1889, and remained in operation until 1905. The source of the name Lilly is uncertain.

References

Unincorporated communities in Clinton County, Missouri
Unincorporated communities in Missouri